The French submarine Souffleur was a  built for the French Navy in the mid-1920s. Laid down in October 1922, it was launched two years later and commissioned in August 1926. Souffleur was torpedoed and sunk on 25 June 1941 off Beyrut, Lebanon in position  by the British submarine .

Design
Propulsion while surfaced was provided by two  diesel motors and two  electric motors.

Citations

References 

World War II submarines of France
Requin-class submarines
Ships sunk by British submarines
Submarines sunk by submarines
World War II shipwrecks in the Mediterranean Sea